Penicillium waksmanii is an anamorph species of the genus of Penicillium which was isolated from the alga Sargassum ringgoldianum. Penicillium waksmanii produces pyrenocine A, pyrenocine C, pyrenocine D and pyrenocine E

Further reading

References 

waksmanii
Fungi described in 1927